Consuelo Castañeda (born 1958) is a Cuban artist, professor, and art critic whose work includes painting, installations, photography, graphic art, architecture, and print. She was a major part of a movement of the relationship between art and politics in the 1980s avant-garde scene and revolutionized how women were treated in the art world. Castañeda was living in Miami, FL up until 2016 where she moved back to Havana, Cuba to finish an exhibition.
Castañeda is also credited with helping to catapult the cultural production of the Cuban avant-garde onto the international stage and shifting the popular
understanding of the relationship between art and politics in Cuba, as well as in
broader Latin America.
In 1977, Castañeda attended the San Alejandro Academy of Fine Arts in Havana, Cuba. She then attended the Advanced Institute of Fine Arts in Havana, Cuba in 1982 where she would then teach.

As a professor at the Instituto Superior de Arte in Havana,
she was a pivotal figure in Cuba until her emigration to Mexico, and then Miami in
the 1990s. Her work as a painter, photographer and multimedia installation artist,
has recently shifted to social media and digital format. Her focus is on creating
interactive works that anyone with a modem and a computer can readily access. Her work resides in several private collections such as the Rodriguez Collection of Cuban Contemporary art at the Kendall Art Center.  
The artist participated in the Havana Biennials in 1984, 1986, and 1991. She was
awarded with the Cinta Fellowship in 1997–1998 as an installation artist.

Exhibitions 
1987 – Castañeda held one of her first selected solo exhibitions called ¿Quien la presta los brazos a  la Venus de Milo? at Teatro Nacional de Cuba in La Habana, Cuba.

1989 – The second exhibition she held was La Historia reconstruye la Imagen, Castillo de la Real Fuerza also in La Habana, Cuba.

1992 – Held her name in an exhibition, Ninart, at the Centro de Cultura in Mexico, D. F.

1993 – Castaneda moved to Miami Florida and continued her work.

1995 – She held the To Be Bilingual at the Fredric Snitzer Gallery in Coral Gables, FL USA.

1996 – Consuelo Castaneda and Quisqueya Henriquez had a collaboration at the Morris-Healy Gallery, New York, NY.

2001 – She held an exhibition called New Work Miami at the Museo de Arte Moderno (MAM) in Miami, FL.

2008 – She held an exhibition called Finding the Self Art@Work in Miami, FL.

Selected group exhibitions

References 

1958 births
Living people
20th-century Cuban women artists
21st-century Cuban women artists
Academia Nacional de Bellas Artes San Alejandro alumni
Academic staff of the Instituto Superior de Arte